Catherine Fleury (born 18 June 1966 in Paris) is a French judoka, world champion and olympic champion. She won a gold medal in the half middleweight division at the 1992 Summer Olympics in Barcelona.

She won a gold medal at the 1989 World Judo Championships, and bronze medals at the 1991 World Judo Championships and at the 1995 World Judo Championships.

References

External links
 
 
 

1966 births
Living people
Sportspeople from Paris
French female judoka
Olympic judoka of France
Judoka at the 1992 Summer Olympics
Judoka at the 1996 Summer Olympics
Olympic gold medalists for France
Olympic medalists in judo
Medalists at the 1992 Summer Olympics
20th-century French women
21st-century French women